Max-Léo Orville (born 1962) is a Ivory Coast-born French politician from the Democratic Movement (MoDem) who has been serving as a Member of the European Parliament since 2022.

Political career 
Orville was candidate in the 2021 French regional elections in Martinique.

Orville joined the European Parliament in May 2022; replacing Chrysoula Zacharopoulou who was appointed to the Borne government. In parliament, he has since been serving on the Committee on Employment and Social Affairs and the Special Committee on the COVID-19 Pandemic.

See also 

 List of members of the European Parliament for France, 2019–2024

References 

Living people
1962 births
MEPs for France 2019–2024

Ivorian emigrants to France
Democratic Movement (France) politicians
Martiniquais politicians